Katari is a Municipality in Udayapur District in the Koshi province  of south-eastern Nepal.It lies by the Tawa river (formed by unification of original Tawa river and Baidhyanath river) having the bridge of length 123.5m. This was established by merging two existing village development committees i.e. Triveni and Katari on 18 May 2014. At the time of the 1991 Nepal census it had a population of 7230 people living in 1410 individual households. Thirty years later, Katari had undergone rapid growth, achieving a population of 56,146 people by the 2011 census.

See also
Triyuga
Belaka
Chaudandigadhi

References

External links
UN map of the municipalities of Udayapur District
Ekhabarpatrika.com Udayapur Katari 

Populated places in Udayapur District
Nepal municipalities established in 2014
Municipalities in Koshi Province
Municipalities in Udayapur District